Umbrella Magazine is a quarterly men's online magazine focusing on fashion, architecture, travel, sport, design and culture for men. The editor is the journalist and musician Anthony Teasdale who has written for Arena, Esquire and FHM and who wrote the tracks; More Sunday Than Saturday and I Think You Love Me. The art director is Matthew Reynolds. Other Freelancer contributors include Kevin Sampson (writer), author of Awaydays and Powder, John Makin, writer of the book, Redman, A Season On the Drink, Brett Foraker, an advertising film director who works for Ridley Scott's advertising company RSA  and Architecture correspondent Justin Clack, director of property consultants Frost Meadowcroft.

History
Issue 1 of Umbrella Magazine was launched in 2010 and included articles on a look back at 1990 The Stone Roses, Poll Tax Riots, Italia '90 (1990 FIFA World Cup) and subject matter such as  classic Indian match boxes and evolution to the Aphex Twin to how to cook a perfect steak.  In Issue 2, Anthony Teasdale writes on how technology killed  
rock ’n’ roll… and gave birth to the ‘experience society’ and  Justin Clack  writes on five new buildings that will change 
London’s skyline for good, including the Shard London Bridge, Lifschutz Davidson Sandilands's Charlotte Building in Gresse Street, London
and One Hyde Park, Knightsbridge. In issue 4 Justin Clack writes an essay on the history of the Westway (London) and Frestonia and in issue 6 he writes on Dagenham Ford whilst Jason Burke British author and journalist writes about his book 9/11 wars.

References

External links
 The Style Raconteur blog
 http://www.discogs.com/artist/Anthony+Teasdale/ Discogs Music database
 The Liverpool Echo regional newspaper
 Company website
 Fusshop, an online magazine shop
 Wigan fanzine
 an online magazine shop
 an online magazine shop

Men's magazines published in the United Kingdom
Quarterly magazines published in the United Kingdom
Magazines established in 2010
Men's fashion magazines
Online magazines published in the United Kingdom
Fashion magazines published in the United Kingdom
Magazines published in London